The 1938–39 season saw Rochdale compete for their 18th season in the Football League Third Division North.

Statistics																				
																				

|}

Final league table

Competitions

Football League Third Division North

F.A. Cup

Football League Third Division North Cup

Lancashire Cup

Football League Jubilee

References

Rochdale A.F.C. seasons
Rochdale